Workers' Solidarity (Nodongjayeondae) is a political organization in South Korea, affiliated with International Socialist Tendency. Workers' Solidarity publishes the weekly newspaper Workers' Solidarity (Nodongja yeondae). And they have a yearly forum, Marxism since 2001.

External links
Workers' Solidarity Website 
Workers' Solidarity Newspaper Website 
International Socialist Tendency
Political organizations based in South Korea
Far-left politics in South Korea
Trotskyist organizations in Asia